SDYuSShOR-4 Sports School Volzhskiy is a Russian football Sports school founded in 1974 in Volzhsky, Volgograd Oblast. It fields a team that plays in the specified Volgograd Oblast Football Championship.

Sports School SDYuSShOR-4 entered the esteemed and prestigious Volga Championship which showcases the utmost best Sport schools at national level.

History

Founded in 1974, it marked its fortieth anniversary in 2014 with an inaugural inter-school sports contest.

References

Sport in Volgograd